The 2001–02 Icelandic Hockey League season was the 11th season of the Icelandic Hockey League, the top level of ice hockey in Iceland. Three teams participated in the league, and Skautafelag Akureyrar won the championship.

Regular season

Final
 Skautafélag Akureyrar - Skautafélag Reykjavíkur 29:6 (Combined score from three games)

External links 
 2001-02 season

Icelandic Hockey League
Icelandic Hockey League seasons
2001–02 in Icelandic ice hockey